Billie Holiday Sings (MGC-118) is a 10-inch LP album made by jazz singer Billie Holiday, released in the United States by Clef Records in 1952. It was her first album for the label, and her first album of original material, following several compilations of previously released 78rpm sides for Columbia, Commodore, and Decca.

In 1956, when the 10-inch format was phased out, the album was reissued by Clef Records as Solitude (MG C-690), with four extra tracks recorded at a second session sometime in April 1952 (exact date unknown), with the same musicians. The final track, "Tenderly", had been previously released on her second 10-inch LP, An Evening with Billie Holiday (MG C-144). The other three new songs had been previously released on her third 10-inch LP, simply titled Billie Holiday (MG C-161).

Track listing

1952 10" LP, Billie Holiday Sings 
A side
 "I Only Have Eyes for You" (Al Dubin, Harry Warren) – 2:57
 "You Turned the Tables on Me" (Louis Alter, Sidney D. Mitchell) – 3:29
 "Blue Moon" (Richard Rodgers, Lorenz Hart) – 3:31
 "(In My) Solitude" (Eddie DeLange, Duke Ellington, Irving Mills) – 3:31
B side
 "These Foolish Things" (Harry Link, Holt Marvell, Jack Strachey) – 3:38
 "(You'd Be So) Easy to Love" (Cole Porter) – 3:01
 "You Go to My Head" (J. Fred Coots, Haven Gillespie) – 2:56
 "East of the Sun (and West of the Moon)" (Brooks Bowman) – 2:54

1956 12" LP, Solitude 
A side
 "East of the Sun (and West of the Moon)" (Brooks Bowman) – 2:54
 "Blue Moon" (Richard Rodgers, Lorenz Hart) – 3:31
 "You Go to My Head" (J. Fred Coots, Haven Gillespie) – 2:56
 "You Turned the Tables on Me" (Louis Alter, Sidney D. Mitchell) – 3:29
 "You'd Be So Easy to Love" (Cole Porter) – 3:01
 "These Foolish Things" (Harry Link, Holt Marvell, Jack Strachey) – 3:38
B side
 "I Only Have Eyes for You" (Al Dubin, Harry Warren) – 2:57
 "(In My) Solitude" (Eddie DeLange, Duke Ellington, Irving Mills) – 3:31
 "Everything I Have Is Yours" (Harold Adamson, Burton Lane) – 3:43
 "Love for Sale" (Porter) – 2:56
 "Moonglow" (Eddie DeLange, Will Hudson, Irving Mills) – 2:58
 "Tenderly" (Walter Gross, Jack Lawrence) – 3:23

Personnel

Performance 
 Billie Holiday – vocals
 Charlie Shavers – trumpet
 Flip Phillips – tenor saxophone
 Oscar Peterson – piano
 Ray Brown – double bass
 Barney Kessel – guitar
 Alvin Stoller – drums

Production 
 Norman Granz – producer
 David Stone Martin – artwork (Billie Holiday Sings)
 Alex de Paula - artwork (Solitude)

References 

1952 albums
1956 albums
Billie Holiday albums
Clef Records albums
Verve Records albums
Albums produced by Norman Granz
Albums with cover art by David Stone Martin
Albums recorded at Radio Recorders